Valerio Sánchez (born c.1902) was a field hockey player who competed for Argentina at the 1948 Summer Olympics. He played in one group game against Spain.

References

External links
 

Olympic field hockey players of Argentina
Argentine male field hockey players
Field hockey players at the 1948 Summer Olympics
Year of birth uncertain
Year of death missing